Kieran Phillips may refer to:
Kieran Phillips (footballer, born 2000), footballer who plays for Exeter City, on loan from Huddersfield Town
Kieran Phillips (footballer, born 2002), footballer who plays for Swindon Supermarine, on loan from Bristol Rovers